Peter Lesser (born 15 August 1941) is an East German former ski jumper.

Career
In 1962 at the Nordic World Ski Championships in Zakopane, he reached fifth place on the large hill.

He improved world record two times; 141 metres (463 ft) in 1962 and 145.5 metres (477 ft) in 1965, both on Kulm ski flying hill in Tauplitz/Bad Mitterndorf, Austria.

Ski jumping world records

 Not recognized! Crash at world record distance.

References

External links

 Peter Lesser at The-Sports.org

1941 births
Living people
German male ski jumpers
People from Eisenberg, Thuringia
Sportspeople from Thuringia